South African-Swiss relations refers to the current and historical relations between South Africa and Switzerland.  South Africa has an embassy in Berne and a general consulate in Geneva.  Switzerland has an embassy in Pretoria and a general consulate in Cape Town.

Trade
Switzerland did not participate in the United Nations-led boycott of apartheid South Africa, though it did observe the arms-embargo. As a result, in 2002 Swiss banks UBS and Credit Suisse faced a $50 billion lawsuit in the United States. Lawyer Ed Fagan led the suit on behalf of the plaintiffs. South African human rights lawyer Dumisa Ntsebeza also coordinated the suit. The Swiss banks firmly denied the charges. The lawsuit was ultimately dismissed.

A Swiss-government funded study revealed in 2005 that Swiss company Sulzer AG provided parts used in South African nuclear weapon-related uranium enrichment, providing necessary fissile material during the 1970s.

See also 
 SwissCham Southern Africa
 Foreign relations of South Africa
 Foreign relations of Switzerland

References

External links 
  South African Department of Foreign Affairs about relations with Switzerland 
  Swiss Federal Department of Foreign Affairs about relations with South Africa

 

 
Switzerland
Bilateral relations of Switzerland